The Legislature of Selangor is the legislature of the state of Selangor, Malaysia. The legislature is made up of two elements: the Sultan of Selangor and the unicameral Selangor State Legislative Assembly. The legislature has existed since Selangor became a state in Malaysia, after the first ever general election in 1959.

Like the Malaysian federal government, Selangor uses the Westminster-style parliamentary government, in which members are sent to the Legislative Assembly after state elections and the Sultan appoints the person who can command a majority of the members of the Assembly, typically the leader of the party with the most seats, as Menteri Besar of Selangor. The Menteri Besar then recommends the appointment of the Selangor State Executive Council. The Menteri Besar is the head of government, while the Sultan is the head of state.

List of Legislature
Following is the list of the 14 times the legislature has been convened since 1959. 
 1st Selangor State Assembly 
 2nd Selangor State Assembly 
 3rd Selangor State Assembly 
 4th Selangor State Assembly 
 5th Selangor State Assembly 
 6th Selangor State Assembly 
 7th Selangor State Assembly 
 8th Selangor State Assembly 
 9th Selangor State Assembly 
 10th Selangor State Assembly 
 11th Selangor State Assembly 
 12th Selangor State Assembly 
 13th Selangor State Assembly 
 14th Selangor State Assembly

See also
List of Malayan State and Settlement Council Representatives (1954–59)#Selangor

References

Politics of Selangor